Storm Aurore was a notably early extratropical cyclone in late October 2021 that impacted several areas of Europe, causing substantial damages. The third named storm of the 2021–22 European windstorm season, Aurore was first noted on October 20 by Meteo France over the Atlantic Ocean, south of Ireland. As the system moved over central Europe on the next day, it subsequently merged with another extratropical cyclone named Hendrik before moving across central Europe, in which it brought several destruction across the region. It then was last noted on October 23.

Gusts of 175 km/h (109 mph) were recorded in an area in Normandy, the highest in association with the storm. Many trees across the affected areas felled, while over half a million people lost electricity. Public establishments were also closed as a precaution to winds and flooding. Flash floods also affected the U.K and a total of six deaths were confirmed from the system: Four in Poland, one in the United Kingdom and another in Germany. Damages were estimated by the Aon Benfield at greater than or equal to $100 million.

Meteorological history 
A strong extratropical cyclone over the north Atlantic Ocean  was named Hendrik I by the Free University of Berlin on October 16. At the same time, the FUB assigned another system near the cyclone Hendrik II. On the next day, the first system remained stationary over the central Atlantic, while the second one moved near France. Both systems interacted with each other on October 18 before the first cyclone became absorbed with the second, two days later. At that day, the Météo-France officially named it Aurore from its naming lists as it entered the English Channel as it continued to strengthen, unleashing powerful wind gusts across its path. It then entered the North Sea and swept northern Netherlands and Germany on the next day before moving northeastwards. It then was last noted on October 23.

Impacts

France 
In France, storm warnings were put in place by the Météo-France for Aurore, with an orange wind warning being issued on October 21. The cyclone first impacted the Atlantic coast of Brittany, downing and uprooting trees and damaging roofs across the area. In Fecamp, Normandy winds reached , the highest in association with the storm. As of October 21, power electric utility Enedis reported over 250,000 households that are without electricity due to Aurore. Along Normandy, Champagne-Ardennes, Paris, and Île-de-France, train services were disrupted while an under-construction house in Plozévet, Finistère. Telephone lines were also affected and several bridges across the affected portion of the country were unpassable for vehicles or their lanes being closed. High tides also inundated several stores at Landerneau, Finistère. Three tornadoes, likely spawned by the storm were recorded in Plozévet, Riec-sur-Belon and Kernascléden. The overall catastrophe was caught many French people in surprise.

United Kingdom 
A yellow rainfall warning was issued for the United Kingdom for Aurore until October 21. Flood warnings were also established due to the storm. The Thames Barrier was closed on that day to refrain London from possible flooding. The Essex fire service reported over 120 calls due to flooding incidents. A section of the M23 motorway between Crawley and Pease Pottage was also closed as a result of flooding. A man in East Grinstead, West Sussex was killed while two others were injured seriously and another two, minor due to a car accident when his car smashed into a tree. Two more cars collided with each other in Farnborough, Hants, but it is unknown whether it caused fatalities or additional injuries. In total, 53 red flood warnings and 117 flood alerts were implemented in the country. In Woking, high winds caused cladding panels from the under construction Victoria Square skyscraper to fall to the street, resulting in evacuations but no injuries. Meanwhile, as the storm impacted the country, snow hit the northern portion of the UK due to a passing cold front, but no damage was reported as of October 21. Across the Channel Islands, several trees were felled and a lifeguard house was blown by the cyclone's winds.

Czech Republic 
Aurore left over 270,000 households in the country without a power supply, which further rose to 300,000 as of October 21.  This number was mainly focused at the Central Bohemian Region. Transportation services were also affected significantly, due to roadways being blocked by downed trees and railway lines. Several passengers at Prague Václav Havel Airport were also stranded due to strong winds from the storm, preventing them to board safely.  The ČEZ Distribuce declared the aforementioned region, Děčín, Česká Lípa, Chrudim, Pardubice, Trutnov, Náchod and Havlíčkův Brod due to the storm's damages. Firefighters also moved and destroyed the trees in Karlovy Vary that are obstructing to roads. Loose metal sheets and even a roof of a kindergarten school were also a problem for them. All three zoos in Ústí nad Labem were also closed. Two people was injured due to a tree smashing their car. Winds of over  impacted the country.

Poland 
Due to Aurore, its meteorological bureau placed several areas in northwest Poland of second-degree warning on October 21. Several trees in Zielona Góra and Gorzow were uprooted as a result of the winds the cyclone brought on the country. Greater Poland, Lower Silesia and Western Pomerania were the areas that are reportedly the most-affected areas by the storm. One person was injured in Bielsko-Biała, authorities there reported. In Baszewice, a tree impacted a train, injuring three people out of its 76 passengers. The side windows and its front part was damaged, according to authorities there. Another person was injured when another tree fell on his car; he was transferred to the hospital to treat his injuries. The highest concerns Polish authorities there reported are limited to felled trees and broken sapling branches. The roofing of a school in Stołeczna was swept away by the storm's strong winds while as of October 21, over 9,693 calls for wind damages were already received by fire brigade authorities across the affected areas of the country. While loading a gate lifted by a crane, one person was non-fatally injured. Another was injured in Gryfino, West Pomeranian Voivodeship. Several zoos were also closed as a precaution. 4 deaths were reported due to the storm, in which two are in Lower Silesia. The other two are due to their car being crushed by a tree in Wrocław. 13 were overall injured by Aurore in the country.

Germany 
The Deutsche Bahn, a railway line station in Germany announced that train services across North Rhine-Westphalia, along with three states in its central and eastern portion were canceled due to the storm. Marine and vessel warnings were also posted, accordingly. Along the country's capital, two recreational zoos were also closed. According to the meteorological service in the country, the Deutscher Wetterdienst (German Weather Service), the cyclone is seen to brought gusts up to 105 km/h (65 mph), along with heavy downpours. Many roofing of public establishments and other houses were damaged, including that of a stadium in Antwerp. Aurore also spawned a tornado in Kiel on October 21, causing several trees to be uprooted and affect cars and public greenhouses being totally wrecked. Four individuals in Barendrecht were injured. The only death from the storm in Germany was recorded on October 21, when a train worker was killed by a falling tree branch.

Belgium and Netherlands
Many trees were uprooted and house roofs and gutters were swept away by the winds in the Netherlands. Private establishments also suffered damages due to the storm, with over €25,000 (USD$23,013) damage being incurred in Plopsaland De Panne. Many calls about obstructions, on public roadways or in front of houses, were also received by authorities there. Aurore also disrupted traffic in Antwerp. On its coastal port, many intermodal containers were affected. A truck swerved over a roadway into a canal, seriously injuring its driver. Train services in the country were cancelled and several areas experienced power outages. Over 376 calls were received by fire brigades and two injuries were also counted there.

Highest gust per country 

• : 175 km/h 

• : 166 km/h

References

External links 

2021 natural disasters
2021 meteorology
Aurore
2021 disasters in the United Kingdom
2021 disasters in Europe